The American Medical College Application Service (AMCAS) is a service run by the Association of American Medical Colleges through which prospective medical students can apply to various medical schools in the United States. It thus acts as something of a Common Application among the schools.

Most US medical schools granting Doctor of Medicine (M.D.) degrees require that students apply through AMCAS.  However, there are seven M.D. schools that do not participate in AMCAS. These schools use the Texas Medical & Dental Schools Application Service (TMDSAS). There are a total of 141 M.D. granting medical schools in the U.S. that use AMCAS, which includes 4 Puerto Rico schools.

Osteopathic medical schools (granting Doctor of Osteopathic Medicine, or D.O., degrees) have a similar system called the American Association of Colleges of Osteopathic Medicine Application Service (AACOMAS).

In 2020, The Association of American Medical Colleges shortens the Medical College Admission Test (MCAT) to rule out experimental issues.

Services 

 AMCAS Letter Service - All letters are to be submitted through AMCAS.
 Criminal Background Check Service - The Association of American Medical Colleges proposes that all U.S. medical schools, after conditional admission to medical school, have a nationwide background search on candidates.

Participating medical schools

References

External links
 Official AMCAS website
 Official AAMC website
 Services
 Texas Medical & Dental Schools Application Service (TMDSAS) for Texas medical, dental and veterinary schools.
 The Ontario Medical School Application Service (OMSAS) for the six medical schools in the Canadian province of Ontario.
 American Association of Colleges of Osteopathic Medicine Application Service (AACOMAS) for osteopathic medical schools.

Medical education in the United States